Ahmad Hassan "Stakoza"  (born 12 April 1979) is an Egyptian footballer. In June 2010, he joined the Egyptian Premier League side, El-Entag El-Harby. He plays as a defensive midfielder

Career
He joined Al Ahly in July 2004 from al-Shrqya sporting club. He did not take his chance in the first season. In the 2006-2007 season he appeared in some matches for Al Ahly and scored the winning goal against Tanta FC.

He joined Ittihad From Al Ahly in summer 2007.

Honours
Club
 Winner of CAF Champions League 2006
 Winner of CAF Champions League 2005
 Winner of Egyptian League (2005–2006)
 Winner of Egyptian League (2004–2005)
 Winner of African Super Cup 2007
 Winner of African Super Cup 2006
 Winner of Egyptian Soccer Cup 2006
 Winner of Egyptian Super Cup 2006
 Winner of Egyptian Super Cup 2005

References

External links
 Ahmed Hassan "Stakoza" At FootballDatabase.eu

1979 births
Living people
Egyptian footballers
Al Ahly SC players
Al Ittihad Alexandria Club players
Association football central defenders
Egyptian Premier League players